Stefania Casini (born 4 September 1948) is an Italian actress, screenwriter, director, and producer. She starred alongside Robert De Niro and Gérard Depardieu in Bernardo Bertolucci's 1900 (1976) and received two David di Donatello Award nominations for her work in the 1983 film Lontano da dove. In recent years she was also the visual inspiration for the comics version of Frank Wedekind's LULU adapted by John Linton Roberson.

Selected filmography

References

External links 
 
 Biography

Italian film actresses
20th-century Italian actresses
1948 births
Living people
Italian film directors
Italian television actresses
People from the Province of Sondrio